Midland History is a peer-reviewed academic journal of the history of the Midlands region of England. It was established in 1971 and is published by Taylor & Francis for the University of Birmingham.

References 

English history journals
Taylor & Francis academic journals
Publications established in 1971
University of Birmingham
1971 establishments in England